Mapusaga is a small village located nine miles west of Pago Pago on Tutuila island in the American territory of American Samoa. Its coordinates are 14.33° south and 170.74389 ° west, with an elevation of 180 feet.  The village is home to American Samoa Community College. An area in the village is called Mapusagafou, which translates to New Mapusaga. Another area in town is known as Mapusagatuai, meaning Old Mapusaga.

The village of Mapusaga was almost entirely displaced during World War II in favor of military installations. It was the location of the U.S. Navy operated Mobile Base Hospital. Mapusaga has been called "Mormon Valley", as the Church of Jesus Christ of Latter-day Saints previously was based here. The Mormons constructed Mapusaga High School in 1928, which was located at the current location of American Samoa Community College (ASCC).

Olotele Mountain is divided between the villages of Mapusagafou (bottom half) and Aoloau (top half). Tucked in the densely rainforested Mapusagafou Mountain is Le Fale’o Cultural Center where there is an authentic village set up with traditional arts, cooking, and customs.

History

A Latter-day Saint village with a school and 360-acre plantation was founded here on May 10, 1903. On November 26, 1906, a Relief Society organization for women was established here. In 1938, the Boy Scout organization was begun at Mapusaga. In 1946, Mormon missionaries returned and re-established a school on the Mapusaga plantation property. In 1953, the missionaries purchased the plantation land. On September 19, 1960, Mapusaga High School opened. A bigger high school was established in Pago Pago in 1965 and in 1974, the church decided to close the Mapusaga High School and lease the facilities to the community college.

American Samoa Community College (ASCC) was established in Fagatogo in July 1970. The freshman class at ASCC had just 131 enrolled students. It moved permanently to its current location in September 1974 when they took over the former facilities of Mapusaga High School. In 1979, the U.S. Economic Development Administration provided a grant to the college which covered the construction of five new modern structures for science, vocational training, the fine arts, and nursing. The college also added a cafe and gym. A new library was constructed at the college in 2003.

Le Faleo'o Samoan Cultural Center was dedicated on February 1, 2020, in Mapusaga Fou. It is the first and the only living museum in American Samoa.

World War II
In April 1942, the village of Mapusaga was eventually displaced in favor of the construction of Mobile Base Hospital Three (MOB 3). Eventually, there were as many as 105 buildings covering thirty acres of land at Mapusaga, which required over 300 tons of cargo in order to be built. During the process of construction and relocation of villagers, a chief known as Savea, his wife Lupe and other displaced villagers were unfailingly gracious. When the first Marine casualties began arriving from the fighting at Guadalcanal and Tulagi, the girls of Mapusaga village showed up at MOB 3 bringing the men flowers. The tanks stationed at Mapusaga were festooned with garlands of flowers, and families gathered around the Marines in support and gave them gifts as they boarded the trucks and left Mapusaga to go to war.

References

 https://web.archive.org/web/20070927001036/http://www.placenames.com/us/p1388990/

Villages in American Samoa